The Arab Women of the Year Awards were created in 2015 and are organized by the London Arabia Organisation with support from the Mayor of London, Regent's University London and The Bicester Village Shopping Collection corporate partners. They are now an annual event, hosted by London Arabia Organisation as well as numerous partners and supporters. 

The Awards do not have set categories, to ensure the women are selected purely on merit, rather than their background or chosen field. Multiple awards are given each year in a wide range of categories and over fifty women have now been awarded.

See also

 List of awards honoring women

References

Awards honoring women